Aaghaz-e-Dosti is an India–Pakistan friendship initiative started in 2012 by Mission Bhartiyam. The founder of Aaghaz-e-Dosti is Ravi Nitesh. It seeks to enhance people-to-people relationship between the two countries, and become the medium through which people of the two countries can discover the reality on the either side of the border to improve understanding. It urges Pakistan, India to reopen diplomatic channels, and supports move on ceasefire commitment.

Aaghaz-e-Dosti has launched a number of projects aimed at improving the relationship between people of India and Pakistan. It provides opportunities for people to make friends with those across the border and encourages young people of the two countries to become pen-pals. A delegation from different parts of India reached Attari at the completion of its Delhi-Attari road trip named "Aman Dosti Yatra 2018", aimed at promoting India-Pakistan peace and friendship. The 40-member delegation of 'Aman-Dosti Yatra' was flagged off by Kuldip Nayar, an Indian journalist, syndicated columnist, human rights activist and former High Commissioner of India to the United Kingdom, and marched from Delhi to Wagah Border under leadership of Aaghaz-e-Dosti.  Aaghaz-e-Dosti launched its 7th Indo-Pak peace calendar on January 20, 2019.

History
In 2012, a group of young educated professionals of India & Pakistan came together to set up Aaghaz-e-Dosti initiative for Indo-Pak friendship in the leadership of Ravi Nitesh. In March 2016, Aaghaz-e-Dosti became an initiative of India-based Mission Bhartiyam and Pakistan-based The Catalyst of Peace. In May 2017, Hum Sab Aik Hain also joined as a collaborator from Pakistan.

Aims
The main aim of Aaghaz-e-Dosti aims to challenge mutual hatred and suspicion and desires to create bonds of peace and friendship between people of India and Pakistan. It seeks to enhance people-to-people communication and to provide a platform to people of both countries where they can learn, talk about peace and they can exchange their ideas. Through this initiative, the Aaghaz-e-Dosti team serves as an avenue for friendship conducted through exchange of letters, greeting cards and cultural and open mic nights via video conferencing. It has a defined working structure consisting of Founder, Conveners, Core Committee and Team Members – city co-ordinators and task-based coordinators. Initiatives of Aaghaz-e-Dosti are Aman Chaupal, greeting card exchange between schools, Indo-Pak Classroom Connect, Indo-Pak Peace Calendar, Indo-Pak Peace Workshop etc.

Awards
 Social Media for Empowerment Award 2016 by Digital Empowerment Foundation (DEF)
 Felicitated as Laureate of Public Peace Prize 2017
 Felicitated at the Global Peace Initiative 2015 hosted by Welingkar Institute of Management Development and Research (Mumbai, India)

References

India–Pakistan relations
Peace movement in India